KWP can stand for:

Kaurna Warra Pintyanthi, a Kaurna language study centre, Adelaide, South Australia
 Key Word Protocol, a protocol service used in diagnostics of motor vehicles
King World Productions, US production company
 Konservatorium Wien, a private music conservatory in Vienna, Austria
 Konspiracyjne Wojsko Polskie, an underground, anti-communist, Polish paramilitary organization
 Workers' Party of Korea, ruling party of North Korea

kWp
kilowatt-peak, a measure of electrical output commonly used for solar energy devices